Cevat Kula (7 July 1902 – 20 April 1977) was a Turkish equestrian. He competed in two events at the 1936 Summer Olympics.

References

1902 births
1977 deaths
Turkish male equestrians
Olympic equestrians of Turkey
Equestrians at the 1936 Summer Olympics
Place of birth missing